Yevhen Murzin (born September 24, 1965 in Novosibirsk) is a former Soviet and Ukrainian men's basketball player and current Ukrainian basketball coach. Currently he is a manager of the Ukrainian Basketball SuperLeague team Kharkivski Sokoly.

He coached the Ukrainian national team at the EuroBasket 2015 and EuroBasket 2017.

References

1965 births
Living people
Sportspeople from Novosibirsk
Soviet men's basketball players
Ukrainian men's basketball coaches
Ukrainian men's basketball players